Newark-on-Trent or Newark is a market town and civil parish in the Newark and Sherwood district in Nottinghamshire, England. It is on the River Trent, and was historically a major inland port. The A1 road bypasses the town on the line of the ancient Great North Road. The town's origins are likely to be Roman, as it lies on a major Roman road, the Fosse Way. It grew up round Newark Castle and as a centre for the wool and cloth trades.

In the English Civil War, it was besieged by Parliamentary forces and relieved by Royalist forces under Prince Rupert. The church is the tallest church in Nottinghamshire and can be seen when entering Newark or bypassing it.

History

Early history
The place-name Newark is first attested in the cartulary of Eynsham Abbey in Oxfordshire, where it appears as "Newercha" in about 1054–1057 and "Niweweorche" in about 1075–1092. It appears as "Newerche" in the 1086 Domesday Book. The name "New werk" has the apparent meaning of "New fort".

The origins of the town are possibly Roman, from its position on an important Roman road, the Fosse Way. In a document which purports to be a charter of 664 AD, Newark is mentioned as having been granted to the Abbey of Peterborough by King Wulfhere of Mercia. An Anglo-Saxon pagan cemetery used from the early fifth to early seventh centuries has been found in Millgate, Newark, close to the Fosse Way and the River Trent. There cremated remains were buried in pottery urns.

In the reign of Edward the Confessor, Newark belonged to Godiva and her husband Leofric, Earl of Mercia, who granted it to Stow Minster in 1055. After the Norman Conquest, Stow Minster retained the revenues of Newark, but it came under the control of the Norman Bishop Remigius de Fécamp, after whose death control passed to the Bishops of Lincoln from 1092 until the reign of Edward VI. There were burgesses in Newark at the time of the Domesday survey. The reign of Edward III shows evidence that it had long been a borough by prescription. The Newark wapentake (hundred) in the east of Nottinghamshire was established in the period of Anglo-Saxon rule (10th–11th centuries).

Medieval to Stuart period
Newark Castle was originally a fortified manor house founded by the Anglo-Saxon King Edward the Elder. In 1073, Remigius de Fécamp, Bishop of Lincoln, put up an earthwork motte-and-bailey fortress on the site. The river bridge was built about this time under a charter from Henry I, as was St Leonard's Hospital. The bishopric also gained from the king a charter to hold a five-day fair at the castle each year, and under King Stephen to establish a mint. King John died of dysentery in Newark Castle in 1216.

The town became a local centre for the wool and cloth trade – by the time of Henry II a major market was held there. Wednesday and Saturday markets in the town were founded in the period 1156–1329, under a series of charters from the Bishop of Lincoln. After his death, Henry III tried to bring order to the country, but the mercenary Robert de Gaugy refused to yield Newark Castle to the Bishop of Lincoln, its rightful owner. This led to the Dauphin of France (later King Louis VIII of France) laying an eight-day siege on behalf of the king, ended by an agreement to pay the mercenary to leave. Around the time of Edward III's death in 1377, "Poll tax records show an adult population of 1,178, excluding beggars and clergy, making Newark one of the biggest 25 or so towns in England."

In 1457 a flood swept away the bridge over the Trent. Although there was no legal requirement to do so, the Bishop of Lincoln, John Chaworth, funded a new bridge of oak with stone defensive towers at either end. In January 1571 or 1572, the composer Robert Parsons fell into the swollen River Trent at Newark and drowned.

After the break with Rome in the 16th century, the establishment of the Church of England, and the dissolution of the monasteries, Henry VIII had the Vicar of Newark, Henry Lytherland, executed for refusing to acknowledge the king as head of the Church. The dissolution affected Newark's political landscape. Even more radical changes came in 1547, when the Bishop of Lincoln exchanged ownership of the town with the Crown. Newark was incorporated under an alderman and twelve assistants in 1549, and the charter was confirmed and extended by Elizabeth I.

Charles I reincorporated the town under a mayor and aldermen, owing to its increasing commercial prosperity. This charter, except for a temporary surrender under James II, continued to govern the corporation until the Municipal Corporations Act 1835.

The Civil War

In the English Civil War, Newark was a Royalist stronghold, Charles I having raised his standard in nearby Nottingham. "Newark was besieged on three occasions and finally surrendered only when ordered to do so by the King after his own surrender." It was attacked in February 1643 by two troops of horsemen, but beat them back. The town fielded at times as many as 600 soldiers, and raided Nottingham, Grantham, Northampton, Gainsborough and other places with mixed success, but enough to cause it to rise to national notice. In 1644 Newark was besieged by forces from Nottingham, Lincoln and Derby, until relieved in March by Prince Rupert.

Parliament commenced a new siege towards the end of January 1645 after more raiding, but this was relieved about a month later by Sir Marmaduke Langdale. Newark cavalry fought with the king's forces, which were decisively defeated in the Battle of Naseby, near Leicester in June 1645.

The final siege began in November 1645, by which time the town's defences had been much strengthened. Two major forts had been built just outside the town, one called the Queen's Sconce to the south-west, and another, the King's Sconce, to the north-east, both close to the river, with defensive walls and a water-filled ditch of 2¼ miles around the town. The King's May 1646 order to surrender was only accepted under protest by the town's garrison. After that, much of the defences was destroyed, including the Castle, which was left in essentially the state it can be seen today. The Queen's Sconce was left largely untouched; its remains are in Sconce and Devon Park.

Georgian era and early 19th century

About 1770 the Great North Road around Newark (now the A616) was raised on a long series of arches to ensure it remained clear of the regular floods. A special Act of Parliament in 1773 allowed the creation of a town hall next to the Market Place. Designed by John Carr of York and completed in 1776, Newark Town Hall is now a Grade I listed building, housing a museum and art gallery. In 1775 the Duke of Newcastle, at the time the Lord of the Manor and a major landowner in the area, built a new brick bridge with stone facing to replace a dilapidated one next to the Castle. This is still one of the town's major thoroughfares today.

A noted 18th-century advocate of reform in Newark was the printer and newspaper owner Daniel Holt (1766–1799). He was imprisoned for printing a leaflet advocating parliamentary reform and for selling a pamphlet by Thomas Paine.

In a milieu of parliamentary reform, the Duke of Newcastle evicted over a hundred Newark tenants whom he believed to support directly or indirectly at the 1829 elections the Liberal/Radical candidate (Wilde), rather than his candidate, (Michael Sadler, a progressive Conservative).

J. S. Baxter, a schoolboy in Newark in 1830–1840, contributed to The Hungry Forties: Life under the Bread Tax (London, 1904), a book about the Corn Laws: "Chartists and rioters came from Nottingham into Newark, parading the streets with penny loaves dripped in blood carried on pikes, crying 'Bread or blood'."

19th–21st centuries
Many buildings and much industry appeared in the Victorian era. The buildings included the Independent Chapel (1822), Holy Trinity (1836–1837), Christ Church (1837), Castle Railway Station (1846), the Wesleyan Chapel (1846), the Corn Exchange (1848), the Methodist New Connexion Chapel (1848), W. N. Nicholson Trent Ironworks (1840s), Northgate Railway Station (1851), North End Wesleyan Chapel (1868), St Leonard's Anglican Church (1873), the Baptist Chapel (1876), the Primitive Methodist Chapel (1878), Newark Hospital (1881), Ossington Coffee Palace (1882), Gilstrap Free Library (1883), the Market Hall (1884), the Unitarian Chapel (1884), the Fire Station (1889), the Waterworks (1898), and the School of Science and Art (1900).

The Ossington Coffee Palace was built by Lady Charlotte Ossington, daughter of the 4th Duke of Portland and widow of a former Speaker of the House of Commons, Viscount Ossington. It was designed to be a Temperance alternative to pubs and coaching inns.

These changes and industrial growth raised the population from under 7,000 in 1800 to over 15,000 by the end of the century. The Sherwood Avenue Drill Hall opened in 1914 as the First World War began.

In the Second World War there were several RAF stations within a few miles of Newark, many holding squadrons of the Polish Air Force. A plot was set aside in Newark Cemetery for RAF burials. This is now the war graves plot, where all but ten of the 90 Commonwealth and all of the 397 Polish burials were made. The cemetery also has 49 scattered burials from the First World War. A memorial cross to the Polish airmen buried there was unveiled in 1941 by President Raczkiewicz, ex-President of the Polish Republic and head of the wartime Polish government in London, supported by Władysław Sikorski, head of the Polish Armed Forces in the West and Prime Minister of the Polish Government in Exile in 1939–1943. When the two died – Sikorski in 1943 and Raczkiewicz in 1947 – they were buried at the foot of the monument. Sikorski's remains were returned to Poland in 1993, but his former grave in Newark remains as a monument. RAF Winthorpe was opened in 1940 and declared inactive in 1959. The site is now the location of the Newark Air Museum.

The main industries in Newark in the last hundred years have been clothing, bearings, pumps, agricultural machinery and pine furniture, and the refining of sugar. British Sugar still has one of its sugar-beet processing factories to the north of the town near the A616 (Great North Road). There have been several factory closures, especially since the 1950s. The breweries that closed in the 20th century included James Hole and Warwicks-and-Richardsons.

Population
Newark's population had a population of 27,700 at the 2011 census. The ONS Mid Year Population Estimates for 2007 indicated that the population had risen to some 26,700. Another estimate (2009): "The population of Newark itself was 27,700 and the district of Newark and Sherwood has a population of 75,000al at the 2011 Census. The Office for National Statistics also identifies a wider "Newark-on-Trent built up area" with a 2011 census population of 43,363 and a "Newark-on-Trent built up area subdivision" with a population of 37,084.

In the 2011 census, 77 per cent of adults in the town are employed, according to the latest ONS data, compared with a national average of 72 per cent. Earnings are 7 per cent above the average in the surrounding East Midlands.

Geography

All are connected to the town by the A46 road.

Newark lies on the bank of the River Trent, with the River Devon running as a tributary through the town. Standing at the intersection of the Great North Road and the Fosse Way, Newark originally grew around Newark Castle, now ruined, and a large market place now lined with historic buildings.

Newark forms a single built-up area with the neighbouring parish of Balderton to the south-east. To the south, on the A46 road, is Farndon, and to the north Winthorpe.

Newark's growth and development have been enhanced by one of few bridges over the River Trent, by the navigability of the river, by the presence of the Great North Road (the A1, etc.), and later by the advance of the railways, bringing a junction between the East Coast Main Line and the Nottingham to Lincoln route. "Newark became a substantial inland port, particularly for the wool trade," though it industrialised somewhat in the Victorian era and later had an ironworks, engineering, brewing and a sugar refinery.

The A1 bypass was opened in 1964 by the then Minister of Transport, Ernest Marples. The single-carriageway, £34 million A46 opened in October 1990.

Governance

The parliamentary borough of Newark returned two Members of Parliament (MPs) to the Unreformed House of Commons from 1673. It was the last borough to be created before the Reform Act. William Ewart Gladstone, later Prime Minister, became its MP in 1832 and was re-elected in 1835, in 1837, and in 1841 twice, but possibly due to his support of the repeal of the Corn Laws and other issues he stood elsewhere after that time.

Newark elections were central to two interesting legal cases. In 1945, a challenge to Harold Laski, the Chairman of the National Executive Committee of the Labour Party, led Laski to sue the Daily Express, which had reported him as saying Labour might take power by violence if defeated at the polls. Laski vehemently denied saying this, but lost the action. In the 1997 general election, Newark returned Fiona Jones of the Labour Party. Jones and her election agent Des Whicher were convicted of submitting a fraudulent declaration of expenses, but the conviction was overturned on appeal.

Newark's former MP Patrick Mercer, Conservative held the position of Shadow Minister for Homeland Security from June 2003 until March 2007, when he had to resign after making racially contentious comments to The Times.

At a by-election on 5 June 2014 after the resignation of Patrick Mercer, he was replaced by the Conservative Robert Jenrick, who was re-elected at the general election of 7 May 2015.

Newark has three local-government tiers: Newark Town Council, Newark and Sherwood District Council and Nottinghamshire County Council. The 39 district councillors cover waste, planning, environmental health, licensing, car parks, housing, leisure and culture. It opened a national Civil War Centre and Newark Museum in May 2015. The area elects ten councillors to Nottinghamshire County Council. It provides children's services, adult care, and highways and transport services. The town has an elected council of 18 members from four wards. Newark Town Council has taken on some responsibilities devolved by Newark and Sherwood District Council, including parks, open spaces and Newark Market. It also runs events such as the LocAle and Weinfest, a museum in the Town Hall, and allotments.

A new police station costing £7 million opened in October 2006.

Education
The town has three main mixed secondary schools. The older, Magnus Church of England Academy, founded in 1531 by the diplomat Thomas Magnus, lies close to the town centre. The Newark Academy is in neighbouring Balderton (previously The Grove School). It underwent a £25 million rebuild in 2016 after a long campaign. In 2020 the Suthers School opened, providing a new Secondary School for Newark

The town's several primary schools include a new school in the Middlebeck development on the town's southern edge, opened in September 2021.

Newark College, part of the Lincoln College, Lincolnshire Group, is situated on Friary Road, Newark, where it is home to the School of Musical Instrument Crafts. The School, which opened in 1972, has courses to train craftspeople to make and repair guitars, violins, and woodwind instruments, and to tune and restore pianos.

Economy
British Sugar PLC runs a mill on the outskirts that opened in 1921. It has 130 permanent employees and processes 1.6 million tonnes of sugar beet produced by about 800 UK growers, at an average distance of 28 miles from the factory. Of the output, 250,000 tonnes are processed and supplied to food and drink manufacturers in the UK and across Europe. At the heart of the Newark factory's operations is a combined heat and power (CHP) plant, with boilers fuelled by natural gas to meet the site's steam and electricity requirements and contribute to the grid enough power for 800 homes. The installation is rated under the government CHP environmental quality-assurance scheme.

Other major employers are a bearings factory (part of the NSK group) with some 200 employees, and Laurens Patisseries, part of the food group Bakkavör since May 2006, which bought it for £130 million. It employs over 1,000. In 2007, Currys opened a £30 million national distribution centre next to the A17 near the A46 roundabout, and moved its national distribution centre there in 2005, with over 1,400 staff employed at the site at peak times. Flowserve, formerly Ingersoll Dresser Pumps, has a manufacturing facility in the town. Project Telecom in Brunel Drive was bought by Vodafone in 2003 for a reported £163 million. Since 1985, Newark has been host to the biggest antiques outlet in Europe, the Newark International Antiques and Collectors Fair, held bi-monthly at Newark Showground. Newark has plentiful antique shops and centres.

Culture
Newark hosts Newark Rugby Union Football Club, whose players have included Dusty Hare, John Wells, Greig Tonks and Tom Ryder. The town has a leisure centre in Bowbridge Road, opened in 2016.

Newark and Sherwood Concert Band, with over 50 regular players, has performed at numerous area events in the last few years. Also based in Newark are the Royal Air Force Music Charitable Trust and Lincolnshire Chamber Orchestra.

The Palace Theatre in Appletongate is Newark's main entertainment venue, offering drama, live music, dance and film.

The National Civil War Centre and Newark Museum, next to the Palace Theatre in Appletongate in the town centre, opened in 2015 to interpret Newark's part in the English Civil War in the 17th century and explore its wider implications.

The district was ranked in a survey reported in 2020 as one of the best places to live in the UK.

Landmarks and treasures

The Market Place is the town's focal point. It includes The Queen's Head, one of the town's old pubs.
The Church of St. Mary Magdalene is a Grade I listed building notable for its tower and octagonal spire ( high), the tallest in the county for a church. It was heavily restored in the mid-19th century by Sir George Gilbert Scott. The reredos was added by Sir Ninian Comper.
Newark Castle was built by the Trent by Alexander of Lincoln, the Bishop of Lincoln in 1123, who established it as a mint. Of the original Norman stronghold, the chief remains are the gate-house, a crypt and the tower at the south-west angle. King John died there on the night of 18 October 1216. In the reign of Edward III it was being used as a state prison. In the English Civil War it was garrisoned for Charles I and endured three sieges. Its dismantling was begun in 1646, after the royalist surrender.
The 16th-century Governor's House, named after Sir Richard Willis, Castle Governor in the English Civil War, is in Stodman Street. Now housing a bread shop and cafe, it is a Grade I listed building.

Newark Torc

The Newark Torc, a silver and gold Iron Age torc, was the first found in Nottinghamshire. It resembles that of the Snettisham Hoard. Uncovered in 2005, it occupies a field on the town's outskirts, and in 2008 was acquired by Newark and Sherwood District Council. The torc was displayed at the British Museum in London until the opening of the National Civil War Centre and Newark Museum in May 2015. It is now shown in the museum galleries.

Churches and other religious sites

Newark's churches include the Grade I listed parish church, St Mary Magdalene. Other Anglican parish churches include Christ Church in Boundary Road and St Leonard's in Lincoln Road. The Catholic Holy Trinity Church was consecrated in 1979. Other places of worship include three Methodist churches, the Baptist Church in Albert Street, and the Church of Promise, founded in 2007.

In 2014 the Newark Odinist Temple, a Grade II listed building in Bede House Lane, was consecrated according to the rites of the Odinist Fellowship, making it the first heathen temple operating in England in modern times.

Transport
Newark is a commuter town, with many residents travelling to Lincoln and Nottingham and even London.

Newark has two railway stations. Newark Castle railway station on the  –  –  line provides cross-country regional links. The two meet at the last flat crossing in Britain. Grade separation has been proposed.

The main roads of Newark include the A1 and A46 as bypasses. The A17 runs east to King's Lynn, Norfolk, and the A616 north to Huddersfield, West Yorkshire. 

The town has its own bus station, Newark bus station. The bus-service providers include Stagecoach in Lincolnshire ("Newark busabouttown"), Marshalls and Travel Wright, under Nottinghamshire County Council control,

Media
The town's weekly Newark Advertiser, founded in 1854, is owned by Newark Advertiser Co Ltd, which also publishes local newspapers in Southwell and Bingham.

The community station Radio Newark began broadcasting on 107.8 FM in May 2015, after three successful trials in 2014 and 2015. It replaced a community station, Boundary Sound, which ceased broadcasting in 2011.

Notable people

Armed forces
Gonville Bromhead (1845–1891), army officer and Victoria Cross recipient educated at Magnus Grammar School
John Cartwright (1740–1824), naval officer, militia major and political reformer educated in Newark.

Fine arts
William Caparne (1855–1940) – botanical artist and horticulturalist born in Newark
William Cubley (1816–1896) – artist settled in Newark
William Nicholson (1872–1949) – painter and illustrator born in Newark

Literature
George Allen (1832–1907) – engraver and publisher born in Newark
John Barnard (died 1683) – biographer and religious writer, who died in Newark
Cornelius Brown (1852–1907) – journalist and historian, Newark Advertiser
Henry Constable (1562–1613) – poet (early sonneteer) born in Newark
Winifred Gales (1761–1839) – novelist and memoirist
T. W. Robertson (1829–1871) – playwright and innovative stage director

Music
John Blow (1649–1708) – composer and organist
Ian Burden (born 1957) – keyboard player with the Human League
Jay McGuiness (born 1990) – band singer with The Wanted

Politics and government
Richard Alexander (1934–2008) – Conservative politician
Ted Bishop (1920–1984) – Labour politician, created Baron Bishopston of Newark in the County of Nottinghamshire
William Robert Bousfield (1854–1943) – Conservative politician, lawyer and psychologist born in Newark
Sir Bryce Chudleigh Burt (1881–1943) – administrator in the British Raj born in Newark
John Cartwright (1740–1824) – politician and preacher, attended Newark Grammar School.
Robert Constable (1522–1591) – parliamentarian and soldier
Robert Heron (1765–1854) – Whig politician

Robert Jenrick (born 1982) – Conservative politician, MP for Newark since June 2014
King John of England (1166–1216) – died in Newark.

Fiona Jones (1957–2007) – Labour politician, MP for Newark
Nigel Doughty (1957–2012) – Former Assistant Treasurer of the Labour Party. Former Nottingham Forest Football Club owner, born in Newark 
Patrick Mercer (born 1956) – Conservative politician, MP for Newark 2001–2014
Arthur Richardson (1860–1936) – Liberal/Labour politician who attended Magnus Grammar School

Religion
Alexander of Lincoln (died 1148) – Bishop of Lincoln, founded a hospital for lepers in Newark.
Annette Cooper (born 1953) – Anglican Archdeacon of Colchester, educated at Lilley and Stone Girls' High School in Newark
John Burdett Wittenoom (1788–1855) – pioneer cleric and headmaster in Swan River Colony, Australia, born in Newark

Science and technology
John Arderne (1307–1392) – notable surgeon, lived in Newark in early life.
Basil Baily (1869–1942) – architect
Francis Clater (1756–1823) – farrier and veterinary writer
Godfrey Hounsfield (1919–2004) – electrical engineer, Nobel Laureate in medicine, inventor of the CT scanner
Rupert Sheldrake (born 1942) – biochemist and parapsychology researcher born in Newark
Giovanni Francisco Vigani (c. 1650–1712) – chemist from Verona, who first settled in Newark in 1682
Frederick Smeeton Williams (1829–1886) – writer on railways

Sports
David Avanesyan (born 15 August 1988) – professional boxer
Steve Baines (born 1954) – League footballer and referee
Phil Crampton (born 1970) – professional alpinist and high-altitude mountaineer
Craig Dudley (born 1979) – professional association footballer
Harry Hall (born 1893 – death date unknown) – professional association footballer
Willie Hall (1912–1967) – Notts County, Tottenham Hotspur and England footballer
Dusty Hare (born 1952) – rugby union international
Phil Joslin (born 1959) – league football referee
Mary King (born Thomson, 1961) – Olympic equestrian sportswoman
Sam McMahon (born 1976) – professional association footballer
Shane Nicholson (born 1970) – league footballer
Henry Slater (1839–1905) – first-class cricketer born in Newark
Mark Smalley (born 1965) – professional association footballer born in Newark
William Streets (born 1772, fl. 1792–1803) – cricketer
Chad Sugden (born 27 April 1994) – professional boxer born in Newark

Stage and screen
Arthur Leslie (1899–1970) – actor and playwright, born in Newark
Norman Pace (born 1953) – actor and comedian
Terence Longdon (1922–2011) – screen actor
Donald Wolfit (1902–1968) – Shakespearean actor
Toby Kebbell (born 1982) – actor educated at the Grove School
Nathan Foad (born 1992) – actor and writer

Twin towns
Since 1984 Newark has been twinned with:
 Emmendingen, Germany
 Saint-Cyr-sur-Loire, France
 Sandomierz, Poland

Arms

References

Bibliography

External links

Newark Town Council
Thoroton Society bibliography
Newark Carnival Community carnival for Newark

 
Towns in Nottinghamshire
Market towns in Nottinghamshire
Newark and Sherwood